This is a list of notable people from Macon, Georgia.

Actors

Luke Askew, actor, Walker, Texas Ranger
Blake Clark, actor, several Adam Sandler films and Boy Meets World
Charles Coburn, Academy Award-winning actor, films including The More the Merrier and The Devil and Miss Jones
Melvyn Douglas, Oscar-winning actor, Hud, Being There, Ninotchka
Sam Edwards, actor, Little House on the Prairie
Montego Glover, actress, Broadway
Grey Henson, actor, Mean Girls (musical)
Sasha Hutchings, actress, Hamilton (musical), Broadway
Felix Knight, actor and tenor, Babes in Toyland
Natalia Livingston, Emmy Award-winning actor, including Days of Our Lives and General Hospital
Jack McBrayer, actor, 30 Rock, Wreck-It Ralph
Carrie Preston, actress, True Blood, The Good Wife
Shavar Ross, actor
Lisa Sheridan, actress
Cassie Yates, actress

Music

Jason Aldean, country music singer
The Allman Brothers, Southern rock band
Bill Berry, member of R.E.M.; lived in Macon in early 1970s
Claudine Clark, R&B musician and composer
Randy Crawford, jazz and R&B singer
Buddy Greene, singer-songwriter, guitar player and harmonica player; gospel music
Ronnie Hammond, lead singer, Atlanta Rhythm Section
Mark Heard, record producer, folk-rock singer-songwriter
Lucille Hegamin, singer, entertainer, pioneer African American blues music recording artist
Randy Howard, outlaw country singer
Jeezy, rapper
Jerry Jemmott, soul bassist
Johnny Jenkins, blues guitarist
Ben Johnston, composer of contemporary music
Rosa King, jazz and blues saxophonist, singer
Chuck Leavell, Allman Brothers and Rolling Stones pianist
Little Richard Penniman, singer-songwriter, and pianist; pioneer of rock and roll
Robert McDuffie, violinist
Emmett Miller, minstrel show singer noted for a yodel-like falsetto voice
Mike Mills, member of R.E.M.; lived in Macon in early 1960s–1970s
The Pickens Sisters, singing trio
The Reddings, Dexter Redding, Otis Redding III, and Mark Lockett
Otis Redding, soul musician
Howard Tate, soul singer-songwriter
Eddie Tigner, blues pianist and singer
Torres, musician
Phil Walden, record producer and music businessman

Politics and government

Augustus O. Bacon, U.S. Senator and President pro tempore of the United States Senate
Charles Lafayette Bartlett, U.S. Congressman
William Shepherd Benson, admiral in the United States Navy; first Chief of Naval Operations (CNO), holding the post throughout World War I
Ellen and William Craft, Abolitionist leaders
John C. Daniels, Mayor of New Haven, Connecticut and Connecticut State Senator
Eugene Ely, first naval aviator, crashed and died in Macon in 1911, in an exhibition, after removing his front elevator from his plane
Nate Holden, former California State Senator
Perry Keith, former member of the Louisiana House of Representatives; born near Macon in 1847
David Perdue, former United States senator of Georgia
P. B. S. Pinchback, Republican Governor of Louisiana for 35 days from 1872 to 1873
Arnold L. Punaro, Major General, United States Marine Corps
Christopher N. Smith, Honorary Consul of the Kingdom of Denmark
Ronnie Thompson, city's first Republican mayor, Republican candidate for Governor of Georgia in 1974, gospel and country singer<ref>Buddy Kelly Moore, "'Machine Gun Ronnie' Thompson: A Political Biography (1976), Master's thesis at Georgia College & State University at Milledgeville, Georgia</ref>
George D. Webster, Brigadier general of the United States Marine Corps
Blanton Winship, Major general of the United States Army, Judge Advocate General (1931–1933)

Sports

Julius Adams, NFL football player, Boston Patriots
Dave Bristol, former MLB manager of Cincinnati Reds, Milwaukee Brewers, Atlanta Braves, and San Francisco Giants
Durant Brooks, former NFL player
Kevin Brown, MLB pitcher
Bobby Bryant, football player
Mallory Burdette, tennis player
Sugar Cain, baseball player
Bud Dupree, NFL player
Larry Emery, football player
 Terry Fair (1960–2020), American-Israeli professional basketball player
Ron Fairly, Major League Baseball player and broadcaster
Gerald Fitch, NBA player
George Foster, NFL player Cleveland Browns
Tony Gilbert, former NFL player
Terrance Gore, MLB player
Russell Henley, golfer on PGA Tour
Richard Howard, U.S. bobsled athlete; silver medalist America's Cup; attended Southwest High School
Kareem Jackson, BCS champion with Alabama Crimson Tide, now cornerback for the NFL's Denver Broncos
Roger Jackson, football player
Marquette King, former NFL player
 Al Lucas, football player in NFL and Arena Football League
Jeff Malone, NBA player
Cole Miller, UFC fighter and reality television star; raised in Macon and attended Mount de Sales Academy
Chip Minton, member of 1994 and 1998 U.S. Olympic bobsled teams
Quintez Cephus, NFL Detroit Lions wide receiver 
Norm Nixon, NBA player
Blue Moon Odom, MLB pitcher, won three World Series with Oakland Athletics, born in Macon
Jim Parker, NFL Hall of Famer for Baltimore Colts; born in Macon
Jerry Pate, pro golfer
Myles Patrick, basketball player
Antonio Pettigrew, sprinter, 1991 world champion in 400 meters; disqualified 2000 Sydney Olympics gold medalist
Kevin Reimer, MLB player for Texas Rangers and Milwaukee Brewers
John Rocker, MLB pitcher
Theron Sapp, University of Georgia and NFL football player
Ken Shamrock, UFC champion and former professional wrestler;
DeAndre Smelter, NFL player 
Elmore Smith, NBA player
Le Kevin Smith, former NFL player for New England Patriots and Denver Broncos; attended Stratford Academy
Vernon "Catfish" Smith, football player
J. T. Thomas, football player
Charles Tidwell, NASCAR pioneer
Corey Williams (basketball, born 1970), NBA basketball Champion, Chicago Bulls
Sharone Wright, basketball player

Other

Mathuren Arthur Andrieu, painter
Samaria (Mitcham) Bailey, local civil rights activist and trailblazer
Mary Ross Banks (1846–1910), litterateur and author
Catherine Brewer Benson, first woman to earn a bachelor's degree from Wesleyan
John Birch, missionary
Sonny Carter, astronaut and professional soccer player
Randolph Royall Claiborne, Jr., bishop
David P. Currie, professor at the University of Chicago Law School
Rodney Maxwell Davis, Medal of Honor recipient, Vietnam War (buried outside the city due to his race)
Bascom S. Deaver, physicist 
Eugenia Tucker Fitzgerald, founder of the first woman's secret society established at a girls' college
Nancy Grace, television personality
LeRoy Wiley Gresham, invalid, Civil War diarist
James Augustine Healy, first African-American Roman Catholic bishop in United States
Michael A. Healy, captain in United States Revenue Cutter Service
Patrick Francis Healy, 29th President of Georgetown University
Marcus Lamb, founder of international Christian TV network called Daystar Television Network
Lucy Craft Laney, African-American educator who in 1883 founded the first school for black children in Augusta, Georgia
Sidney Lanier, poet and musician
Ellamae Ellis League, architect, first woman FAIA from Georgia
John LeConte, president of University of California
Joseph LeConte, geologist
James Creel "Jim" Marshall, mayor and U.S. Congressman
Earl W. McDaniel (1926–1997), physicist
Rhett McLaughlin, YouTuber with Link Neal for the channels Rhett and Link and Good Mythical Morning
Lydia Meredith, author
Wilbur Mitcham, renowned Southern chef
Adam Ragusea, YouTube chef
Neel Reid, architect
Gwyn Hyman Rubio, author
William Sanders Scarborough, scholar
Anya Krugovoy Silver, poet
Laurence Stallings, playwright
Edgar Wayburn, longtime Sierra Club president, helped double U.S. parkland
Leila Ross Wilburn, one of the first women architects in Georgia
Rufus Youngblood, deputy director of the US Secret Service; bodyguard of Lyndon B. Johnson at the time of the assassination of John F. Kennedy; born 
Lee Everett, main character of the 2012 video game The Walking Dead''

References

Macon
Macon